Brandon Clark may refer to:

Sports
Brandon Clark (athlete) in 2014 Oceania Athletics Championships
Brandon Clark, in 2013–14 Santa Clara Broncos men's basketball team
Brandon Clarke (born 1996), Canadian-American professional basketball player

Others
Brandon Clark Band in Diversafest
Brandon Clark, contestant in The Voice (U.S. season 3)
Brandon Clark, convicted in the murder of Bianca Devins

See also
Clark Brandon, actor